Enrique Fidel Verástegui Peláez  (24 April 1950 – 27 July 2018), was a Peruvian author and mathematician. He was a member of Movimiento Hora Zero with the poets Jorge Pimentel, Juan Ramírez Ruiz, Jorge Nájar, Enriqueta Belevan and Carmen Ollé.

He was born in Lima but grew up in the city of San Vicente de Cañete. He finished his secondary studies at G.U.E. José Buenaventura Sepúlveda in that same city. After moving to Lima, he studied economics, administration and accounting at the National University of San Marcos. In 1975 he recorded his poems for the Library of Congress of the United States and worked for El Colegio de México. In 1976 he received a Guggenheim Fellowship.

In 1977, he co-founded the Segunda Etapa of Movimiento Hora Zero in Paris with José Carlos Rodríguez and André Laude and published his book The Motor of Desire (El motor del deseo).  In 1978, representing the Peruvian community, he read his poems at the tomb of César Vallejo, which earned him the congratulations of Julio Ramón Ribeyro, the Peruvian consul to UNESCO. In 1992 he published his novel trilogy, entitled Terceto de Lima. In 1999 he wrote Pro-total Apology: Essay on Stephen Hawkings, the Peruvian equivalent of the Novum Organum by Francis Bacon, which suggests original developments of algebra. He also invented the Scientific Research Method of pre-duction, which is superior to induction and deduction. He also published El Modelo del Teorema (The model of the theorem).

Works

Poetry

Philosophy

Theory of Poetry 
 El análisis de la poesía.

Mathematics

Travel Journals

Novels

Tales

Theater 
 El exorcismo de Bellmer.
 Agonizar: homenaje a César Vallejo

Music and ballet 
 Proyecto para una òpera en New York.
 En los sótanos más cochinos de la belleza.

Art 
 La expansión matemàtica. (Arte cognitivo).

Scripts

References

External links

1950 births
2018 deaths
People from Lima
Peruvian poets
Peruvian philosophers
Peruvian novelists
Peruvian writers
National University of San Marcos alumni